Surviv.io was a browser based multiplayer online 2D battle royale game created by Justin Kim and Nick Clark. It was released in October 2017 on its website for desktop browsers, and in October and November 2018 respectively for iOS and Android devices. Similar to other titles in the battle royale genre, players battle against other players on a large map from a top-down perspective, scavenging for supplies and weapons. The game also supported two or four player team modes, and could be played on mobile browsers as well.

In December 2019, Surviv.io was acquired by online gaming website Kongregate.

In September 2020, Surviv.io was released on Steam.

On February 14, 2023, Kongregate announced that they would be shutting down Surviv.io.

Gameplay 

Players, also called "Survivrs", are represented by circular figures on a 2D grid-like playing field, surrounded by a circular "red zone" that shrinks as the game progresses. Players in the “red zone” lose health every second, and the amount of health lost per second increases as the game progresses. Players start with only their fists, while extra gear can be found in breakable crates and objects located across the map, and in houses and other buildings. Each game features a randomly generated map, with the locations of buildings and loot being randomized each time. Players drop all their items upon death, and the last player alive wins.  

The game has a rotation of limited time modes with special gameplay modes that offer exclusive weapons and items.

Equipment 
Weapons in Surviv.io range from close-quarter shotguns and SMGs to long range sniper and assault rifles. Melee weapons such as katanas and throwable grenades can also be found. Most weapons require additional ammunition, which is found separately. Scopes give players a wider view of their surroundings, which vary from 1x (the smallest field of vision) to 15x (the largest field of vision). Vests and helmets protect the player and vary in protection level. Players heal using consumable healing items.

Development 
Surviv.io is developed by Justin Kim and Nick Clark. Kim stated that their design philosophy while developing the game was to allow the player to enter a game as fast as possible by minimizing the time in between matches.

At launch, Surviv.io did not have accounts or the ability to track one's statistics. Accounts were added significantly later in an update.

In December 2019, Surviv.io was acquired by online gaming website Kongregate, with the company taking over development of the game. In a press release, the company stated they hoped to "invest in the game’s features, especially on mobile." Co-creator Justin Kim expressed that the team was "excited to have Kongregate's team create new features and expand the player experience over the years to come."

In 2020, Kim and Clark announced they would be taking a break and the development would be fully passed on to Kongregate.

On February 14, 2023, Kongregate announced that they would be shutting down Surviv.io.

Reception 
PC Gamer praised the game's fast paced gameplay and short matchmaking times, calling it "one of the most enjoyable BR games out there."

In May 2018, VG247 described the game as the "most popular battle royale title after Fortnite and PlayerUnknown's Battlegrounds".

See also
 ZombsRoyale.io, a similar browser-based battle royale game

References

External links 

 

Browser-based multiplayer online games
Battle royale games
Browser games
macOS games
Windows games
2017 video games
IOS games
.io video games
Android (operating system) games

Video games developed in the United States